This Is Petula Clark was a comedy/variety television show that aired on the BBC, with the first six-episode series in summer of 1966 and a seven-episode series from December 1967 to January 1968. In the episodes, host Petula Clark intermingled her own contemporary hits with other popular standards, and introduced to the British public international stars who were relatively unknown in the UK. Guests included Claude François, Raphael, Fred Bongusto, Sacha Distel and Les Surfs.

External links
List of episodes
Media coverage

This is Petula Clark